Fernando Tejero Muñoz-Torrero (born 24 February 1967) is a Spanish actor. Among his work, he has acted in multiple films, including Football Days (2003), for which he won the Goya Award for Best New Actor, and television series like Aquí no hay quien viva (2004), for which he won the TP de Oro Award.

Early life and career
Since he was very young, Tejero knew he wanted to be an actor. However his father wanted Tejero to become a bullfighter. During his childhood and adolescence in Córdoba, Andalucía.

Tejero studied acting at the Escuela de Arte Dramático de Córdoba, the Centro Andaluz de Teatro and the Escuela de Arte Dramático Cristina Rota de Madrid.

As a struggling actor, Tejero worked with his parents in a seafood market. According to Tejero, during this period in his life, he had his first bad experience with showbusiness. He said he met a very famous Spanish actress with whom he had a cordial conversation. She ignored him and looked at him with contempt when she discovered he worked at a seafood market.

Tejero went on to perform in bit parts in Spanish movies, slowly gaining recognition. He was able to establish a bond with a production company called Animalario. In 2003, he was offered a role in Días de fútbol, for which he won the Goya Award for best new actor. In that same year, during the casting of the now-famous Spanish ensemble comedy Aquí no hay quien viva, he was originally offered the part of Paco, the video store clerk. However, a new role was subsequently created for him, that of Emilio, the concierge; this allowed him a much more visible role than originally planned. With the show's great success, Tejero has become a household name in Spain.

Since then, he has had leading roles in films, such as El penalti más largo del mundo. In 2010, he covered the song So payaso by Extremoduro with the Asturian singer Melendi. In 2011 he participated in the video clip Gypsy Funky Love Me Do by Rosario Flores.

In 2012 he played Fermín Trujillo in La que se avecina, being Lola's father (Macarena Gómez) and Estela Reynolds' husband (Antonia San Juan).

Personal life
Tejero is openly gay, and during a time he dated Miguel Ortíz Vera, Mister Gay Spain 2012. They broke up in 2013, at the time when he announced he was gay. They reconciled days after. In 2016 he dated the musician Pascual Cantero, and they broke up one year later.

Partial filmography

Accolades 

 TP de Oro: Best Television Actor (2004)
 Premio Fotogramas de Plata: Best Television Actor (2005)

References

External links

Bio Page at the Antena 3 Web Portal

1967 births
Living people
Spanish gay actors
Spanish LGBT actors
Spanish male film actors
Spanish male television actors
21st-century Spanish male actors